"My Bad" is a song by American singer Khalid, released as a promotional single on March 7, 2019, along with the pre-order of his second studio album Free Spirit. The song was called an "apology track", with Khalid saying sorry for not replying to a person's text.

Charts

Weekly charts

Year-end charts

Certifications

References

2019 singles
2019 songs
Khalid (singer) songs
Songs written by D'Mile
Songs written by Khalid (singer)